Intermountain Christian School (ICS) is a private non-denominational Christian school  in Holladay, Utah, United States, that was founded in 1982.

Description
Founded in 1982, Intermountain Christian School is a top 10 , Pre-K through 12th-grade private Christian school centrally located on the east side of Salt Lake City. It is the only Pre-K through 12th-grade non-denominational Christian school in the area. Fully accredited by AdvancED, the school's exemplary education is displayed in academics, athletics, fine arts, and community outreach.

The ICS community relentlessly pursues exemplary and effective academics by teaching and developing students’ tools, skills, and foundations in an engaged, biblically integrated learning environment. The ICS community also affirms students as individuals and encourages them to solidify their identity in Christ, take ownership of their learning, and develop their unique character and talents while growing as image-bearers of God.

Ultimately we desire to send our students into this world ready to find their purpose, conquer their spheres, and make an impact on the world around them. We desire to help them to thrive in God’s world.

Facilities and curriculum

The school building features computer labs, a school library, a dual-purpose cafeteria and fellowship hall, and a gymnasium used for athletics, basketball, and volleyball, as well as church activities.

ICS has an athletics program, with several sports for boys and girls. Middle and high school girls play basketball, volleyball and soccer. High school boys play baseball, basketball, soccer, and golf. Middle school boys play soccer and basketball.

At the elementary level, the school offers music, physical education, library, and computer classes, along with core classes. There is also a school band in which fifth grade students can join.

See also

 List of high schools in Utah

References

External links

 

Christian schools in Utah
Private high schools in Utah
Private middle schools in Utah
Private elementary schools in Utah